Olkhovka is a rural locality (a selo) in Klintsovsky District, Bryansk Oblast, Russia. The population was 979 as of 2010. There are 18 streets.

Geography 
Olkhovka is located 9 km west of Klintsy (the district's administrative centre) by road. Pervoye Maya is the nearest rural locality.

References 

Rural localities in Klintsovsky District